James A. DeLeo is a former Democratic member of the Illinois Senate, representing the 10th district since 1992, and is an Assistant Majority Leader. Earlier he served in the Illinois House of Representatives. He announced his retirement from the State Senate in 2010, and left office in August 2010. Democrat John G. Mulroe was appointed to replace him and defeated Republican Brian Doherty for a full term in office in the 2010 general election.

Education 
DeLeo was educated in the Chicago Public Schools; he later attended Chicago's Loop Junior College (now Harold Washington College) and DePaul University where he majored in political science.

State representative 
Before becoming a state senator, DeLeo served in the Illinois House of Representatives. In 1990, DeLeo negotiated a guilty plea on a misdemeanor tax offense, and was placed on probation.

Senate career 

DeLeo sponsored legislation to increase funding for diabetes research by giving individual taxpayers the opportunity to designate contributions on their income tax returns. He also sponsored resolution SJR0061 of the 95th General Assembly honoring the life the late Rosemont, Illinois Mayor, Donald E. Stephens. In the Senate DeLeo served as Vice-Chairman of the Senate Committee on Executive Appointments, and was a member of the Senate Executive Committee and the Senate Local Government Committee.

DeLeo chose to leave office in August 2010 and Democratic candidate John G. Mulroe was appointed to complete the remainder of his term. Mulroe ran for and won a full term in 2010 general election.

Personal life 
DeLeo co-owns a bar in Chicago, the Tavern on Rush, with Illinois Senate President John Cullerton (D-Chicago) and others.

References

External links 
Illinois General Assembly - Senator James DeLeo (D) 10th District official IL Senate website
Bills Committees
Project Vote Smart - Senator James A. DeLeo (IL) profile
Follow the Money - James A DeLeo
2006 2004 2002 2000 1998 1996 campaign contributions
Illinois State Senate Democrats - Senator James A. DeLeo profile

1951 births
Living people
Democratic Party Illinois state senators
2000 United States presidential electors
DePaul University alumni
Democratic Party members of the Illinois House of Representatives
2004 United States presidential electors
2008 United States presidential electors
2012 United States presidential electors
Illinois politicians convicted of crimes
21st-century American politicians